Election Markup Language (EML) is an XML-based standard to support end to end management of election processes.

History of EML
The OASIS Election and Voter Services Technical Committee, which met for the first time in May 2001, was chartered 
"To develop a standard for the structured interchange of data among hardware, software, and service providers who engage in any aspect of providing election or voter services to public or private organizations. The services performed for such elections include but are not limited to voter role[sic]/membership maintenance (new voter registration, membership and dues collection, change of address tracking, etc.), citizen/membership credentialing, redistricting, requests for absentee/expatriate ballots, election calendaring, logistics management (polling place management), election notification, ballot delivery and tabulation, election results reporting and demographics."

To help establish context for the specifics contained in the XML schemas that make up EML, the Committee also developed a generic end-to-end election process model, initially based on work by election.com, whose CTO chaired the first meetings.  This model identifies the significant
components and processes common to elections and electoral systems,
and describes how EML can be used to standardize the information
exchanged between those components.

The specification describes two complementary high-level process models of an election exercise, based on the human and technical views.  The goal is to identify all the major steps involved in the process and the areas where data is to be exchanged or referenced.  Then the messages and data formats detailed in the EML specifications themselves can be used to achieve the goals of open interoperability between system components around those processes.

Overview of EML
Voting is one of the foundations of democratic processes.  In addition
to providing for the orderly transfer of power, it also cements the
citizen's trust and confidence in an organization or government when it
operates efficiently.  Access to standardized information in the
voting process for voters as well as standardized data interchange can better facilitate
verification and oversight for election procedures.
Standards for clear, robust and precisely
understood processes help promote
confidence in the results.  Election data interchange standardization
fosters an open marketplace that
stimulates cost effective delivery and adoption of new technology
without obsolescing existing investments.  However, traditional verification methods and oversight will continue
to be vital, and in fact these things become more critical with the use of technology.  A healthy
democracy requires participation from citizens and continuous
independent monitoring of processes, procedures and outcomes.  The OASIS
EML standard seeks to help facilitate transparency, access and
involvement for citizens to the election process.

The primary function of an electronic voting system is to capture voter preferences reliably and securely and then report results accurately, while meeting legal requirements for privacy. The process of vote capture occurs between 'a voter' (individual person) and 'an e-voting system' (machine). It is critical that any election system be able to prove that a voter's choice is captured correctly and anonymously, and that the vote is not subject to tampering, manipulation or other sources of undue influence.

These universal democratic principles  can be summarized as a list of fundamental requirements, or 'six commandments', for electronic voting systems:

 Keep each voter's choice an inviolable secret.
 Allow each eligible voter to vote only once, and only for those offices for which he/she is authorized to cast a vote.
 Do not permit tampering with the voting systems operations, nor allow voters to sell their votes.
 Report all votes accurately
 The voting system shall remain operable throughout each election.
 Keep an audit trail to detect any breach of [2] and [4] but without violating [1].

EML was developed following these guidelines.

Design of EML

The goal of the committee is to develop an Election Markup Language (EML) for end-to-end use within the election process. This is a set of data and message definitions described as a set of XML schemas and covering a wide range of transactions that occurs during various phases and stages of the life cycle of an election. To achieve this, the committee decided that it required a common terminology and definition of election processes that could be understood internationally. The committee therefore started by defining the generic election process models described here.

These processes are illustrative, covering the vast majority of election types and forming a basis for defining the Election Markup Language itself. EML has been designed such that elections that do not follow this process model should still be able to use EML as a basis for the exchange of election-related messages.

EML is focused on defining open, secure, standardised and interoperable interfaces between components of election systems and thereby providing transparent and secure interfaces between various parts of an election system. The scope of election security, integrity and audit included in these interface descriptions and the related discussions are intended to cover security issues pertinent only to the standardised interfaces and not to the internal or external security requirements of the various components of election systems.

The security requirement for the election system design, implementation or evaluation must be placed within the context of the vulnerabilities and threats analysis of a particular election scenario. As such the references to security within EML are not to be taken as comprehensive requirements for all election systems in all election scenarios, nor as recommendations of sufficiency of approach when addressing all the security aspects of election system design, implementation or evaluation. In fact, the data security mechanisms described in EML documentation are all optional, enabling compliance with EML without regard for system security at all.  It is anticipated that implementers may develop a complementary document for a specific election scenario, which refines the security issues defined in this document and determines their specific strategy and approach by leveraging what EML provides.

EML is meant to assist and enable the election process and does not require any changes to traditional methods of conducting elections. The extensibility of EML makes it possible to adjust to various e-democracy processes without affecting the process. Conceptually EML simply enables the exchange of data between the various end-to-end election stages and processes in a standardized way.

The solution outlined in EML is non-proprietary and will work as a template for any election scenario using electronic systems for all or part of the process. The objective is to introduce a uniform and reliable way to allow election systems to interact with each other. The OASIS EML standard is intended to reinforce public confidence in the election process and to facilitate the job of democracy builders by introducing guidelines for the selection or evaluation of future election systems.

For more details on the EML approach see the formal OASIS standard specification.

Versions of EML
 EML v7.0 was adopted as an OASIS Committee Specification in October 2011 
 EML v6.0 was adopted as an OASIS Committee Specification in August 2010 
 EML 5.0 was adopted as an OASIS Standard in December 2007.

EML-related technologies

EML utilizes a number of existing standards:

 Extensible Markup Language (XML): EML templates are expressed in a standardized XML
 XML Schema: EML utilizes XSD Schema for defining the information structures supporting the election processes XML Schema.
 xNAL: eXtensible Name and Address (xNAL) Specifications and Description Document (v3.0) Customer Information Quality Technical Committee OASIS July 2009
 UK's APD: Address and Personal Details Fragment v1.1 Technology Policy Team, e-Government Unit, Cabinet Office UK, 1 March 2002
 XML-DSig: XML-Signature Syntax and Processing Donald Eastlake et al., World Wide Web Consortium, 10 June 2008
 VoiceXML: Voice Extensible Markup Language (VoiceXML) Version 2.0 Scott McGlashan et al. World Wide Web Consortium 16 March 2004

EML endorsements
Ron Rivest, renowned computer scientist and member of the Technical Guidelines Development Committee of the US Election Assistance Commission was quoted as saying
"EML is an example of the kind of consensus-based, publicly available common format that enables the exchange of electronic records between different components in election systems."

Although not an endorsement per se, EML is used by the Australian Electoral Commission for the release of up-to-date counts for federal elections through their "Media Feed".

See also
 OASIS
 XML

References

More - 
 [EML Brochure] OASIS EML document., white paper Brochure on EML and its Capabilities. Document link EML brochure.
 [Open Secure Voting] Webber et al., white paper White Paper on Open Secure Voting with EML. Document link EML white paper.
 [Trusted Logic Voting] Trusted Logic Voting with OASIS EML, David Webber, 2005.
 [EML Case Study - Results Reporting] White Paper to NIST on California use of EML. David Webber, 2009.

External links
 OASIS Election Markup Language Technical Committee
 Cover Pages: Executive Overview of EML
 OASIS wiki resources site for EML

Election technology
XML-based standards